Transcend Music, is a British record label and artist management company. Founded in 2007 by Rob Ferguson, they have signed acts such as Malefice and The Dirty Youth.

History
Transcend Music was founded as Transcend Records in Milton Keynes, United Kingdom in 2007. Initially, the label's main focus was rock and metal, though a wider variety in genre of earlier releases included acid folk and art rock.  Founder Rob Ferguson has stated, "starting the label was something I was driven to do out of frustration. I was already working with bands in a management capacity and I felt that I could offer a better solution for those artists to get their music out and advance their careers."

Ferguson had previously worked with artists as diverse as George Harrison, Pete Townshend, John Entwistle, Duran Duran, Iron Maiden, The Spice Girls, and Robbie Williams. He was also personal manager to both Matt Goss and Luke Goss from teen band Bros, and continues to represent Matt Goss in his solo career, currently headlining at Caesars Palace Las Vegas.

In October 2016 it was announced that British pop supergroup Bros would be re-forming for a one-off show at London's o2 Arena.  This show subsequently sold out in 7 seconds, become the fastest ever sellout at the venue promoted by Live Nation. A number of other arena shows have now been announced, Rob Ferguson also heads up the Bros management team.

The label's first full-length release was The Unholy Feast by The More I See, produced by Andy Sneap.

By 2008 the label had expanded to also handle management and merchandise. They also changed their name to Transcend Music. In 2009 they signed an exclusive distribution deal with Plastic Head Music in Europe, the biggest independent distributor in the UK. In March 2010 they announced they had absorbed the management and booking operation Legacy Agency, which had been formed in late 2008 by Carl Sewell. Legacy had by then worked with bands such as Carcer City and While She Sleeps. Transcend Music announced "a major restructuring program" in June 2012, which involved new signings and streamlining measures, as well as absorbing RMR Management.

In 2015 Transcend Music evolved in to total music and entertainment consultancy business.  The client base now includes, artists, promoters, production companies, and event management organisations.

Interesting connections

Ferguson is featured in a number of real crime books, including two by UK gangster Reggie Kray and more recently in books by modern celebrity gangster Dave Courtney. Ferguson took a number of celebrities to meet Reggie Kray in prison, including the Fun Lovin Criminals. In April 2000 Ferguson was pictured in the funeral cortege of Charlie Kray, in the car with 'Mad' Frankie Fraser and Bartley Gorman King of the Gypsies. Ferguson has also been reported in private meetings with Lord Jeffrey Archer.

Artists
Transcend Music has a roster of artists it releases music for or manages and consults for, these include The Dirty Youth, Viking Skull Matt Goss, Crash Mansion, and Stormbringer. Rob Ferguson has stated that he signed Sacred Mother Tongue after first spotting them playing metal covers and a few original songs in a pub.

Current roster

Bros
Matt Goss
Scott McWatt
Lewis Macleod
A Sight For Sewn Eyes
 Arcite
 Bossk
 Canvas
 Carcer City
Cavorts
Continents
Crash Mansion
 Giants
 Heart Of A Coward
 Heights
 Hellish Outcast
 I Divide
 In Archives
 The Injester
Liferuiner
Malefice
 Pavilions
Sleep When You're Dead
 Stormbringer
Subsource
 The Charm The Fury
 The Dirty Youth
 Viking Skull
 Yashin

Gallery

Discography

Source: The Genepool Discography

See also 
 List of independent UK record labels

References

External links
TranscendMusic.com
Transcend Music on MySpace
Transcend Music on Twitter
Transcend Music on Facebook
Transcend Music on YouTube
 Bravewords Article About Label Restructure
Rob Ferguson Interview on TopRockRadio (2009)

British record labels
Record labels established in 2007
Heavy metal record labels